Karlheinz Subklewe (born 6 December 1950) is a former German footballer.

Subklewe made a total of 42 appearances in the Fußball-Bundesliga and 121 in the 2. Bundesliga during his playing career.

References 
 

1950 births
Living people
German footballers
Association football forwards
Bundesliga players
2. Bundesliga players
Tennis Borussia Berlin players
FC 08 Homburg players
20th-century German people